is a railway station in the city of  Sano, Tochigi, Japan, operated by the private railway operator Tōbu Railway. The station is numbered "TI-39".

Lines

Station layout
Kuzū Station consists of a single dead-headed side platform.

Adjacent stations

History
Kuzū Station opened on 23 March 1894. From 17 March 2012, station numbering was introduced on all Tōbu lines, with Kuzū Station becoming "TI-39". A new station building was completed in September 2014.

Passenger statistics
In fiscal 2019, the station was used by an average of 936 passengers daily (boarding passengers only).

Surrounding area
 Former Kuzū Town Hall
 Kuzū Post Office

See also
 List of railway stations in Japan

References

External links

 Tobu station information 
	

Tobu Sano Line
Stations of Tobu Railway
Railway stations in Tochigi Prefecture
Railway stations in Japan opened in 1894
Sano, Tochigi